Mirów Halls are two twin market halls located in the Mirów neighbourhood, in central Warsaw, Poland. 

Constructed between 1899 and 1902, it was Warsaw's first major food hall complex and also the city's largest market. The buildings were partially destroyed during the 1944 Warsaw Uprising and restored to its original function as a market in the 1950s and 1960s.

See also
Hala Koszyki, other market hall in Warsaw, build 1909.

External links
Hala Gwardii website
Hala Mirowska on "Społem" WSS Śródmieście website

References

Buildings and structures in Warsaw
Rebuilt buildings and structures in Poland
Commercial buildings completed in 1902
Buildings and structures in Poland destroyed during World War II